Diphenylpyraline (DPP; sold as Allergen, Arbid, Belfene, Diafen, Hispril, Histyn, Lergobine, Lyssipol, Mepiben, Neargal) is a first-generation antihistamine with anticholinergic effects of the diphenylpiperidine class. It is marketed in Europe for the treatment of allergies. DPP has also been found to act as a dopamine reuptake inhibitor and produces hyperactivity in rodents. It has been shown to be useful in the treatment of Parkinsonism.

Synthesis

References 

H1 receptor antagonists
Piperidines
Diphenylmethanol ethers
Stimulants